TxtWeb was a SMS platform for mobile app developers. It was launched by Intuit in 2011 and shutdown in 2014 because of being unviable. It enables users to chat with anybody online without any internet connectivity. It was founded by Scott Cook, Manish Shah, Manish Maheshwari and Clinton Nielsen.

History
TxtWeb was founded in 2011. This platform provided access to a wide range of information in a simple SMS format. 

As of 2011,  the app had 700,000 free users across 400 towns and cities.

References

External links
Mobile App Development

Mobile software development
Integrated development environments
Mobile software programming tools